Skúvoy  or Skúgvoy  is an island in the central Faroe Islands, located to the south of Sandoy.

It is named after the large number of great skua present on the island (who have a habit of attacking intruders). There is only one settlement on the island: Skúvoy on the east coast. There are two mountains: Knúkur (392 m) and Heyggjurin Mikli (391 m).

History
The Black Death in the 14th century killed all the inhabitants except one woman; her cottage can still be seen.
Skúvoy was also the home of Sigmundur Brestisson, the hero of the Færeyinga saga (Saga of the Faroese).

Bird habitat
There are 300–400 m cliffs along the west coast, which are home to many guillemots. Egg harvesting takes place in early June, though this occurs in the first week only so as to allow the guillemots to lay again. The island has been identified as an Important Bird Area by BirdLife International because of its significance as a breeding site for seabirds, especially northern fulmars (50,000 pairs), Manx shearwaters (10,000 pairs), European storm petrels (20,000 pairs), great skuas (25 pairs), Atlantic puffins (40,000 pairs), common guillemots (135,000 pairs) and black guillemots (150 pairs), as well as 40 breeding pairs of Eurasian whimbrels.

References

External links 
 personal website with 9 aerial photos of Skúvoy

Islands of the Faroe Islands
Important Bird Areas of the Faroe Islands